Boyster (Molusco) is a 2D CGI animated television series that premiered on Disney XD on June 16, 2014. The titular Boyster character is half human and half mollusk, and his name is a portmanteau of "boy" and "oyster."

Plot 
The series focuses on the adventures of a half-human, half-oyster mutant named "Boyster", who was adopted by a pair of humans and raised alongside his oyster brother Shelby. Naturally, Boyster has to keep his oyster side under wraps, but he will use his many oyster-esque abilities to save the day.

Characters

Main

Boyster Likowski (voiced by Akie Kotabe) is the main protagonist and title character of the series. He is a half-human half-oyster child, has only two hairs and is endowed with superpowers: these include spitting pearls, stretching his limbs to infinity, etc. He is shy and horrified that someone might discover his powers. It is because of an oil spill that he and his brother are mutants, they were found on the beach and then adopted by Lola and Eugene Likowski. He is 11 years old at the beginning of the series but at the end, he is 12 years old. He is a fan of Spido-Dude, a reference to Spider-Man.
Shelby Likowski (voiced by Matthew Forbes) is Boyster's clam twin brother. He is intelligent and has a very high IQ. He almost never leaves his home and prefers to watch television all day long (which is where he gets all his knowledge from). He is obsessed with the "Prestige and Passion" series and admires the theories of Charles Darwin.
Rafik (voiced by Rasmus Hardiker) is Boyster's best friend. He's around 11-13 years old, and an over-excited kid. He is one of the only characters in the series to know Boyster's secret. He loves to act, make drama for any situation and often finds things funny even if they aren't really funny. He gets jealous when Boyster spends time with someone else, and he is arrogant and boastful, always thinking he is the best even giving himself the nickname "Rafik the Magnificent". He has light brown skin, brown hair, and wears a brown jacket, a green t-shirt and brown pants.

Supporting

Eugene Likowski is the adoptive father of Boyster and Shelby. He is a botanist and he is very fond of gardening. He has brown skin and wears an apron with an apple in the middle which could indicate that he likes to cook. He is overprotective of Boyster and wouldn't want anything to happen to him.
Lola Likowski (voiced by Jules de Jongh) is the adoptive mother of Boyster and Shelby. She is an ingenious person and she loves fixing cars and making objects. She has brown hair in a bun, she wears a pink t-shirt with blue overalls and red shoes.
Alicia (voiced by Lizzie Waterworth) is Boyster's love interest. She has brown hair in a ponytail, light brown skin, a red bow tie and has bigger eyebrows than the other characters. She wears a red t-shirt with a white heart in the middle, a brown skirt, gray leggings and red shoes. She is very rich and her parents are stingy and obsessed with money and want her to marry a billionaire at all costs. Alicia dreams of becoming an artist and loves drawing portraits of her beloved cat, Vanilla. Alicia is a nice girl, with a strong sense of integrity, who can't stand being rejected. She likes Boyster a lot but does not suspect that he has a crush on her and, worse, that he has powers. She is around 11-13 years old.
Ozzy (voiced by Rasmus Hardiker) is Boyster's worst enemy and one of his comrades. A vain, idiotic and arrogant person, he loves hitting and putting people down, especially Boyster and Arthur. He seems to be in love with Alicia but obviously she doesn't love him due to his meanness. Ozzy has a lack of self-confidence and would like to be able to impress his two ruthless and muscular sisters by showing them that he can be as strong as them. He's not very brave and has orange hair, big eyebrows, a purple jacket and the majority of the students are shorter than him in height. He is described as being "ugly" by Rafik.
Arthur (voiced by Rasmus Hardiker) is a socially inept nerd with a passion for the extraterrestrial. He has brown hair, small eyebrows, and two teeth protruding from his mouth. He wears round green glasses, a green cap with a triangle and an alien head in the middle, a green t-shirt too big for him with the same symbol as his cap and a brown collar and gray pants with two dark gray vertical stripes. He is very smart and is able to create an alien detector, he has been collecting toasters since he was 5 years old and is a fan of Sherlock Holmes. He doesn't have very good breath, he is in the chess club and was in the detective club. He gets harassed and beaten by Ozzy but, despite this, he remains sympathetic towards Ozzy and would like to be his friend. He has a pet spider named Ursula.
Marion Pluss (voiced by Rob Rackstraw) is Boyster and Rafik's math teacher. His goal in life is to be the strictest teacher in the world. He has black hair, and wears a tuxedo and glasses. Mr. Pluss is a cruel and unfair sadist who gets pleasure out of mistreating his students and is usually seen angry or shouting. He has robotic vision and his students call him the "Teachinator".

Episodes

Season 1

Awards and nominations

References

External links
 

2010s French animated television series
2014 French television series debuts
2017 French television series endings
French children's animated comedy television series
French-language television shows
Disney XD original programming
French computer-animated television series
France Télévisions children's television series
France Télévisions television comedy
Animated television series about children